Altlandsberg is a historic town in the district of Märkisch-Oderland, in Brandenburg, Germany.

History
Altlandsberg was first mentioned in a 1230 deed, it was located at the site of a former Slavic (Sprevane) settlement. The area then was resettled in the course of the German Ostsiedlung, promoted both by the Ascanian Margraves of Brandenburg and the rivaling Margraves of Meissen from the House of Wettin. The town's name may refer to Saxon Landsberg Castle and therefore indicate an establishment by the Wettins. In 1245 the tensions rose to an armed conflict, in which the Ascanians maintained their grounds. From that time on Altlandsberg remained with Brandenburg.

The city was laid out at the behest of the Ascanian rulers, their successor Margrave Louis I from the Bavarian House of Wittelsbach even established a monastery of the Servite Order in 1335, which was dissolved during the Protestant Reformation. Altlandsberg was devastated by the Hussites in 1432, it was affected by several town fires and plague epidemics in the 16th century. The medieval town was burnt down completely in 1632 during the Thirty Years' War. A hoard of 7450 gold and silver coins dating from the 14th and early 15th century was discovered in the grounds of the former manor in late 2016. The dates suggest that it was buried in order to protect it during the Hussite wars. It is the largest hitherto found in the state of Brandenburg, and is now being examined in the archeological museum in Brandenburg an der Havel.

Demography

Mayors
In 1993 Ravindra Gujjula was elected mayor, he was in office till 2003.  Manfred Andruleit was the mayor from 2003 till 2007.

In July 2007 Arno Jaeschke (independent) was elected with 54,8 % of the votes. He was reelected in June 2015 with 56,8 % of the votes.

Sons and daughters of the town

  (1780–1851), architect and Berlin city planner
  (1850–1931), member of parliament (SPD)
 Erasmus Schöfer (1931-2022), writer
  (born 1941), theater actor and director
 Dagmar Enkelmann (born 1956), member of parliament (Die Linke ("The Left"))

Other personalities who are associated with the town

 Frederick I (Prussia)(1657–1713), first king of Prussia, was educated in Altlandsberg 
 Gujjula Ravindra Reddy (born 1954), 1993-2003 honorary mayor of Altlandsberg

Gallery

References

External links

Localities in Märkisch-Oderland